This article shows the rosters of all participating teams at the Women's World Champions Cup 2017 in Tokyo and Nagoya, Japan.

The following is the Brazilian roster in the 2017 FIVB Volleyball Women's World Grand Champions Cup.

Head coach: José Roberto Guimarães

The following is the Chinese roster in the 2017 FIVB Volleyball Women's World Grand Champions Cup.

Head coach: An Jiajie

The following is the Japanese roster in the 2017 FIVB Volleyball Women's World Grand Champions Cup.

Head coach: Kumi Nakada

The following is the Korean roster in the 2017 FIVB Volleyball Women's World Grand Champions Cup.

Head coach: Hong Sung-jin

The following is the Russian roster in the 2017 FIVB Volleyball Women's World Grand Champions Cup.

Head coach: Vladimir Kuzyutkin

The following is the American roster in the 2017 FIVB Volleyball Women's World Grand Champions Cup.

Head coach: Karch Kiraly

See also
 2017 FIVB Volleyball Men's World Grand Champions Cup squads

References

External links

2017 Women
FIVB Volleyball
FIVB Volleyball
International volleyball competitions hosted by Japan
September 2017 sports events in Asia